Mojisola Adekunle-Obasanjo (10 August 1944 – 4 June 2009) was a Major in the Nigerian army. She founded the party Masses Movement of Nigeria in 1998 and later ran for the Presidency under the  party Masses Movement of Nigeria (MMN) in 2003. She was on the ballot as the only female contender for the 2007 presidential elections.

She was also an ex-wife (1991–1998) of former President Olusegun Obasanjo.

Adekunle-Obasanjo died on Thursday, June 4, 2009 at her daughter-Adetokunbo's residence in Ikoyi Lagos after a brief illness. She survived by four children and numerous grandchildren.

Political career 
Mojisola worked as a Radiologist with the Nigerian Army for most of her career before she retired to run for office. In 2003, Major Mojisola ran as a presidential candidate in the national and Gubernatorial election.  She received a total number of 157,560 votes which was equivalent to 0.40% of the approved votes.

She also ran in the 2007 Nigerian Elections and was defeated.

References

External links 
 MMN
 Sun News Online
 

1944 births
2009 deaths
Nigerian Army officers
Yoruba female military personnel
Obasanjo family
Yoruba women in politics
Nigerian female military personnel
Candidates in the Nigerian general election, 2003
Candidates in the Nigerian general election, 2007
21st-century Nigerian women politicians
21st-century Nigerian politicians